Wavrans-sur-l’Aa (literally Wavrans on the Aa) is a commune in the Pas-de-Calais department in the Hauts-de-France region of France.

Geography
It is home to a site of great ecological interest, which justified the creation of a voluntary nature reserve, which become the Grottes et Pelouses d'Acquin-Westbecourt et Coteaux de Wavrans-sur-l'Aa National Nature Reserve in 2008

Population

See also
Communes of the Pas-de-Calais department

References

Wavranssurlaa